The Idiot (2017) is the semi-autobiographical first novel by the Turkish American writer Elif Batuman. It is a bildungsroman, and concerns a college freshman, Selin, attending Harvard University in the 1990s.

Plot
Selin Karadağ is a freshman studying linguistics at Harvard University. She meets an older Hungarian mathematics student, Ivan, in a Russian language class and the two begin corresponding over email, and occasionally spend time together in person. While Selin and Ivan at times seem interested in each other romantically, neither know how and when to express their feelings. The summer after her freshman year, Selin travels to Paris with her college friend Svetlana, and then to Hungary to teach English in a remote village, a job she accepts partly to be closer to Ivan. At the end of the summer, Selin returns to Harvard and Ivan goes to California to pursue graduate mathematics.

Reception
The Idiot was a 2018 Pulitzer Prize Finalist in Fiction. According to the literary review aggregator LitHub, the novel received mostly positive reviews. Writing for The New York Times, Dwight Garner describes how "Each paragraph is a small anthology of well-made observations." However, Garner ultimately describes the protagonist, Selin, as "an interesting human who, very much like this wry but distant novel, never becomes an enveloping one." Conversely, Annalisa Quinn of NPR asserts that "The Idiot encapsulates those years of humiliating, but vibrant, confusion the come in your late teens, a confusion that's not even sexual, but existential and practical". Quinn concludes by noting that, "The Idiot is both boring and strangely intense, fraught and apparently meaningless, confusing and inevitable, endless — and over in a moment." Vox gave the novel 3.5 stars out of 5, with reviewer Constance Grady noting that "the atmosphere at the heart of The Idiot is one of linguistic alienation, when the distance between what words say and what they mean seems insurmountable." Grady further describes how "the heartbreak that ensues is slightly melancholy, but it’s not overwhelming: The Idiot doesn’t bring you in close enough for that. It keeps you far enough away that you have to pay more attention to its words than to the emotions that they’re describing."

References

2017 American novels
Novels set in Harvard University
American bildungsromans
Novels set in the 1990s
Novels set in Boston
Novels set in Paris
Novels set in Hungary